The 1952 Tasmanian Australian National Football League (TANFL) premiership season was an Australian Rules football competition staged in Hobart, Tasmania over fifteen (15) roster rounds and four (4) finals series matches between 19 April and 27 September 1952.

Participating Clubs
Clarence District Football Club
New Town District Football Club
Hobart Football Club
New Norfolk District Football Club
North Hobart Football Club
Sandy Bay Football Club

1952 TANFL Club Coaches
Les McClements (Clarence)
Bill Fox (Glenorchy)
Bill Tonks (Hobart)
Arthur Olliver & Cliff Taylor (Stand-In) (New Norfolk)
Len Mclankie (North Hobart)
Gordon Bowman (Sandy Bay)

TANFL Reserves Grand Final
Clarence 13.13 (91) v Hobart 5.9 (39) – North Hobart Oval

TANFL Under-19's Grand Final
State Schools Old Boys Football Association (SSOBFA) 
North West 6.9 (45) v Macalburn 6.8 (44) – North Hobart Oval
Note: North West affiliated to North Hobart, Macalburn affiliated to Hobart.

Intrastate Matches
Jubilee Shield (Saturday, 24 May 1952) 
TANFL 13.16 (94) v NTFA 9.14 (68) – Att: 7,675 at York Park

Jubilee Shield (Saturday, 14 June 1952) 
TANFL 19.17 (131) v NWFU 12.12 (84) – Att: 18,387 at North Hobart Oval *
Note: This match was a curtain raiser to a VFL Premiership fixture between Fitzroy and Melbourne.

Jubilee Shield (Saturday, 5 July 1952) 
TANFL 10.17 (77) v NWFU 4.8 (32) – Att: 6,500 at Devonport Oval

Jubilee Shield (Saturday, 2 August 1952) 
NTFA 13.15 (93) v TANFL 13.12 (90) – Att: 7,063 at North Hobart Oval

Leading Goalkickers: TANFL
Ian Westell (Sandy Bay) – 81
Bernie Waldron (Hobart) – 79
Les McClements (Clarence) – 49
Michael Wade (Hobart) – 38
Rex Garwood (New Town) – 33

Medal Winners
Cliff Busch (New Norfolk) – William Leitch Medal
Joe Whittle (Hobart) – George Watt Medal (Reserves)
John Cracknell (South East) – V.A Geard Medal (Under-19's)

1952 TANFL Ladder

Round 1
(Saturday, 19 April 1952) 
Sandy Bay 8.11 (59) v Hobart 7.10 (52) – Att: 1,999 at North Hobart Oval
New Town 9.16 (70) v Nth Hobart 5.8 (38) – Att: 1,523 at New Town Oval
Clarence 18.12 (120) v New Norfolk 12.11 (83) – Att: 1,476 at Boyer Oval

Round 2
(Saturday, 26 April 1952) 
New Town 14.9 (93) v Clarence 11.11 (77) – Att: 4,265 at North Hobart Oval
Hobart 20.19 (139) v New Norfolk 5.13 (43) – Att: 1,066 at TCA Ground
Sandy Bay 12.7 (79) v Nth Hobart 7.16 (58) – Att: 1,970 at Queenborough Oval

Round 3
(Saturday, 3 May 1952) 
New Town 21.21 (147) v New Norfolk 11.10 (76) – Att: 1,714 at North Hobart Oval
Hobart 13.10 (88) v Nth Hobart 12.10 (82) – Att: 2,189 at TCA Ground
Sandy Bay 16.10 (106) v Clarence 11.14 (80) – Att: 3,050 at Queenborough Oval

Round 4
(Saturday, 10 May 1952) 
Clarence 14.13 (97) v Nth Hobart 14.10 (94) – Att: 3,119 at North Hobart Oval
Hobart 15.16 (106) v New Town 9.14 (68) – Att: 2,397 at New Town Oval
Sandy Bay 26.15 (171) v New Norfolk 10.7 (67) – Att: 1,568 at Boyer Oval

Round 5
(Saturday, 17 May 1952) 
Nth Hobart 15.5 (95) v New Norfolk 9.18 (72) – Att: 1,700 at North Hobart Oval
Hobart 21.18 (144) v Clarence 13.9 (87) – Att: 2,608 at TCA Ground
Sandy Bay 12.16 (88) v New Town 10.10 (70) – Att: 3,333 at Queenborough Oval

Round 6
(Saturday, 31 May 1952) 
New Town 16.10 (106) v Nth Hobart 14.12 (96) – Att: 2,749 at North Hobart Oval
Hobart 7.12 (54) v Sandy Bay 8.4 (52) – Att: 3,057 at Queenborough Oval
Clarence 15.27 (117) v New Norfolk 6.9 (45) – Att: 1,023 at Bellerive Oval

Round 7
(Saturday, 7 June & Monday, 9 June 1952) 
Clarence 9.13 (67) v New Town 8.11 (59) – Att: 2,793 at TCA Ground *
Hobart 10.20 (80) v New Norfolk 1.7 (13) – Att: 673 at Boyer Oval
Sandy Bay 16.17 (113) v Nth Hobart 4.9 (33) – Att: 4,360 at North Hobart Oval (Monday)
Note: The Saturday match was switched from North Hobart to the TCA Ground due to poor ground conditions and inclement weather.

Round 8
(Saturday, 21 June 1952) 
Hobart 16.14 (110) v Nth Hobart 4.12 (36) – Att: 1,661 at North Hobart Oval
New Town 12.19 (91) v New Norfolk 3.9 (27) – Att: 1,051 at New Town Oval
Sandy Bay 8.9 (57) v Clarence 7.3 (45) – Att: 2,854 at Queenborough Oval

Round 9
(Saturday, 12 July 1952) 
New Norfolk 12.9 (81) v Sandy Bay 8.13 (61) – Att: 1,192 at North Hobart Oval
Hobart 12.25 (97) v New Town 13.14 (92) – Att: 2,411 at TCA Ground
Nth Hobart 10.20 (80) v Clarence 9.9 (63) – Att: 1,360 at Bellerive Oval
Note: This round was postponed on 28 June due to poor ground conditions and inclement weather.

Round 10
(Saturday, 19 July 1952) 
New Town 20.8 (128) v Sandy Bay 13.9 (87) – Att: 3,625 at North Hobart Oval
Hobart 11.17 (83) v Clarence 9.9 (63) – Att: 1,270 at Bellerive Oval
New Norfolk 7.17 (59) v Nth Hobart 6.10 (46) – Att: 1,476 at Boyer Oval

Round 11
(Saturday, 26 July 1952) 
Clarence 7.14 (56) v New Norfolk 5.9 (39) – Att: 2,112 at North Hobart Oval
Hobart 17.8 (110) v Sandy Bay 14.16 (100) – Att: 2,105 at TCA Ground
New Town 18.16 (124) v Nth Hobart 14.9 (93) – Att: 1,550 at New Town Oval

Round 12
(Saturday, 9 August 1952) 
Nth Hobart 10.11 (71) v Sandy Bay 9.12 (66) – Att: 2,290 at North Hobart Oval
Hobart 23.18 (156) v New Norfolk 6.12 (48) – Att: 848 at TCA Ground
Clarence 8.25 (73) v New Town 7.17 (59) – Att: 1,934 at Bellerive Oval

Round 13
(Saturday, 16 August 1952)  
Clarence 10.10 (70) v Sandy Bay 9.15 (69) – Att: 3,507 at North Hobart Oval
Hobart 13.22 (100) v Nth Hobart 5.10 (40) – Att: 1,449 at TCA Ground
New Town 19.16 (130) v New Norfolk 8.11 (59) – Att: 986 at Boyer Oval

Round 14
(Saturday, 23 August 1952) 
New Town 13.9 (87) v Hobart 11.17 (83) – Att: 4,028 at North Hobart Oval
Clarence 15.9 (99) v Nth Hobart 8.19 (67) – Att: 1,065 at TCA Ground
Sandy Bay 19.11 (125) v New Norfolk 6.9 (45) – Att: 1,113 at Queenborough Oval

Round 15
(Saturday, 30 August 1952) 
Nth Hobart 15.9 (99) v New Norfolk 6.10 (46) – Att: 694 at North Hobart Oval
Hobart 25.8 (158) v Clarence 13.12 (90) – Att: 1,483 at TCA Ground *
New Town 20.15 (135) v Sandy Bay 8.12 (60) – Att: 3,368 at New Town Oval
Note: Bernie Waldron (Hobart) equals the TANFL record with 15.3, also a Hobart club record.

First Semi Final
(Saturday, 6 September 1952) 
Sandy Bay: 4.1 (25) | 5.5 (35) | 10.8 (68) | 13.11 (89)
Clarence: 4.6 (30) | 5.8 (38) | 6.11 (47) | 8.11 (59)
Attendance: 6,521 at North Hobart Oval

Second Semi Final
(Saturday, 13 September 1952) 
Hobart: 3.3 (21) | 7.6 (48) | 11.7 (73) | 15.11 (101)
New Town: 2.1 (13) | 6.4 (40) | 8.7 (55) | 9.12 (66)
Attendance: 8,592 at North Hobart Oval

Preliminary Final
(Saturday, 20 September 1952) 
Sandy Bay: 4.3 (27) | 6.4 (40) | 11.6 (72) | 13.6 (84)
New Town: 2.3 (15) | 3.7 (25) | 5.7 (37) | 5.10 (40)
Attendance: 4,218 at North Hobart Oval

Grand Final
(Saturday, 27 September 1952) 
Sandy Bay: 3.5 (23) | 4.7 (31) | 10.7 (67) | 14.9 (93)
Hobart: 2.2 (14) | 8.3 (51) | 10.7 (67) | 11.9 (75)
Attendance: 11,086 at North Hobart Oval

Source: All scores and statistics courtesy of the Hobart Mercury publication.

Tasmanian Football League seasons